Porte de Saint-Cloud is a station of line 9 the Paris Métro.  The station is named after the Porte de Saint-Cloud, a gate in the nineteenth century Thiers Wall of Paris, which led to the town of Saint-Cloud. It serves the Parc des Princes, a stadium and home of the Paris Saint-Germain F.C.

History 
The station opened on 28 September 1923 with the extension of the line from Exelmans, serving as its western terminus until its extension to Pont de Sèvres in 1934. A track exists to the west of the station in a tunnel called Voie Murat which leads to the ghost station of Porte Molitor, ultimately connecting to the southwest of the Auteuil loop on line 10. It also leads to the Auteuil workshops.

In 2019, the station was used by 5,174,694 passengers, making it the 77th busiest of the Métro network out of 302 stations.

In 2020, the station was used by 2,576,290 passengers amidst the COVID-19 pandemic, making it the 80th busiest of the Métro network out of 305 stations.

In 2021, the station was used by 3,485,946 passengers, making it the 78th busiest of the Métro network out of 305 stations.

Passenger services

Access 
The station has 6 accesses:

 Access 1: Parc des Princes
 Access 2: avenue Édouard-Vaillant Boulogne Billancourt
 Access 3: avenue Georges-Lafont
 Access 4: rue Gudin
 Access 5: avenue de Versailles
 Access 6: boulevard Murat

Station layout

Platforms 
The station has a particular arrangement specific to the stations serving or had served as a terminus. It has 4 tracks divided amongst 2 island platforms and 1 side platform. Trains from Mairie de Montreuil can only stop on the northernmost track (the side platform) while trains from Pont de Sèvres usually stop on the southernmost track, although it occasionally uses the two central tracks either for long-term stabling or to allow short-working trips to turn back trains to Mairie de Montreuil for passenger services to allow for a higher frequency along that stretch.

Other connections 
The station is also served by the following bus networks:

 RATP bus network:  lines 22, 42, 62, 72, 175, 189, 289, and PC
 Sénart bus network : line 54
 Noctilien: lines N12 and N61

Nearby 

 Fontaines de la porte de Saint-Cloud
 Hôpital Henri-Dunant
 Lycée Claude-Bernard
 Parc des Princes
 Stade Pierre-de-Coubertin

Gallery

References

Roland, Gérard (2003). Stations de métro. D’Abbesses à Wagram. Éditions Bonneton.

Paris Métro stations in the 16th arrondissement of Paris
Railway stations in France opened in 1923